ISEP may refer to:

Instituto Superior de Engenharia do Porto or Porto Superior Institute of Engineering, in Porto, Portugal
Institut supérieur d'électronique de Paris, a French IT engineering university
Indiana State Excise Police

See also
 Isep, a village in Poland